British Homophone was a record pressing company. Around 1935, the company was purchased by Crystalate. The company pressed some of the early Island Records releases around 1962, and the name British Homophone continued to be used until 1985.

References

External links 

Audio equipment manufacturers of the United Kingdom